Bad Pyrmont is a town in the district of Hamelin-Pyrmont, in Lower Saxony, Germany, with a population close to 19,000. Bad Pyrmont is a popular spa resort that gained its reputation as a fashionable place for princely vacations in the 17th and 18th centuries. The town is also the center of the Religious Society of Friends (Quakers) in Germany.

History
Formerly called Pyrmont, it was the seat of a small county during much of the Middle Ages. In 1557, the county was inherited by Lippe, then by the County of Gleichen in 1583.

In 1625, the county became part of the much larger County of Waldeck through inheritance. In January 1712, the Count of Waldeck and Pyrmont was elevated to hereditary prince by Emperor Charles VI, the count having combined the two titles the previous year.

For a brief period, from 1805 to 1812, Pyrmont was again a separate principality as a result of inheritance and partition after the death of the previous prince, but the two parts were united again in 1812. The principality of Waldeck-Pyrmont retained its status after the Congress of Vienna of 1815 and became a member of the German Confederation. In 1813, the inhabitants of Pyrmont began to protest at their lack of autonomy within Waldeck–Pyrmont and the separate constitutional nature of the two territories was confirmed the following year, until a formal union was established in 1849.

From 1868 onward, the principality was administered by Prussia, but retained its legislative sovereignty. Prussian administration served to reduce administrative costs for the small state and was based on a ten-year contract that was repeatedly renewed. In 1871 it became a constituent state of the new German Empire. At the end of World War I, during the German Revolution the prince abdicated and Waldeck–Pyrmont became a free state within the Weimar Republic. On 30 November 1921, following a local plebiscite, the town and district of Pyrmont were detached and incorporated into the Prussian Province of Hanover, with Waldeck following into the Prussian province of Hesse-Nassau in 1929.

Economy
As a spa town, Bad Pyrmont's economy is heavily geared towards tourism.

Bad Pyrmonter mineral water is bottled in Bad Pyrmont.

Attractions
Bad Pyrmont features a large , with a sizeable outdoor palm garden. The Baroque castle (1706–10) is part of a substantial complex of fortifications dating from the 16th century. The castle now houses the Museum of Municipal and Spa History.

Notable people
 Emil Albes (1861–1923), German actor
 Max Born (1882–1970), Physicist, Nobel Prize winner and grandfather of Olivia Newton-John, spent his last years in Bad Pyrmont
 Rainer Brüninghaus (born 1949), German composer and jazz pianist
 Ferdinand Büchner (1823–1906), German flautist and composer 
 Friedrich Drake (1805–1882), German sculptor
 Paul-Gerhard Klumbies (born 1957), German protestant theologian
 Caren Marks (born 1964), German politician (SPD)
 Johannes Schraps (born 1983), German politician (SPD)
 Sigrid Sternebeck (born 1949), former member of the Red Army Faction
 Theodor Stroefer (1843–1927), German publisher
 Thomas Webel (born 1954), German politician (CDU)
 Helmut Wildt (1922–2007), German actor
 Detlef Zühlke (born 1947), German engineer and professor

Gallery

Twin towns – sister cities 
Bad Pyrmont is twinned with:

  Anzio, Italy

See also
 Hannover–Braunschweig–Göttingen–Wolfsburg Metropolitan Region
 Pyrmont, New South Wales, a suburb of Sydney named after Bad Pyrmont

References

External links

 Official website

Multimedia
 CBC Radio reports on surrender of the town, 22 April 1945

Spa towns in Germany
1494 disestablishments
States and territories established in 1805
1812 disestablishments in Germany
1849 disestablishments in Germany
Hameln-Pyrmont
Principality of Waldeck and Pyrmont